, sometimes credited as Kihaji Okamoto, is a Japanese video game designer. He is credited with producing popular titles for Konami, including Gyruss and Time Pilot, and for Capcom, including 1942, Gun.Smoke, Final Fight and Street Fighter II. He later founded the companies Flagship and Game Republic, and then created the hit mobile games Dragon Hunter and Monster Strike for Mixi. He also played a role in the creation of Rockstar's Red Dead franchise. Several franchises he helped create are among the highest-grossing video game franchises of all time, including Street Fighter II, Monster Strike and Red Dead.

History

Early career at Konami
His early games Time Pilot (1982) and Gyruss (1983) innovated in the shoot 'em up genre during the golden age of arcade games. The Killer List of Videogames included both Gyruss and Time Pilot in its list of top 100 arcade games of all time. Although these games turned out to be successful titles for Konami, Okamoto's employer was not happy as apparently Okamoto had been told to create a driving game instead. Internal disagreements, financial and credible, caused his termination from Konami.

Career at Capcom
Joining Capcom in 1984, Okamoto directed several arcade games such as 1942 (1984), SonSon  (1984), and Side Arms (1986). His 1985 shoot 'em up Gun.Smoke later inspired a spiritual successor, Red Dead Revolver, the first installment of the Red Dead series.

The last game he directed was the 1989 CP System game Willow (1989). He would oversee the development of Capcoms subsequent games as a producer and was responsible for recruiting character designer Akira Yasuda for Capcom. Okamoto and Yasuda developed some of Capcom's biggest hits, most notably the beat 'em up game Final Fight (1989) and fighting game Street Fighter II (1991). Street Fighter II is estimated to have grossed  as of 2017, making it the third highest-grossing video game of all time, after Space Invaders and Pac-Man.

Okamoto worked on the 1996 survival horror game Resident Evil (Biohazard in Japan). Additionally, he produced the movie adaptation and its sequel.

In 1997, he resigned from Capcom to start his own video game development company, Flagship. He continued to develop video games for Capcom through Flagship.

Okamoto approached Angel Studios with the idea for an original intellectual property entitled S.W.A.T. It later adopted a Western theme at Okamoto's recommendation, redefining the acronym as "Spaghetti Western Action Team". It was intended to be a spiritual successor to Gun.Smoke. Angel Studios began work on the game with Capcom's oversight and funding in 2000, and Capcom announced the game as Red Dead Revolver in March 2002. Okamoto then left Capcom, which canceled the game in August 2003. Rockstar Games acquired the rights to Red Dead Revolver in December 2003 and resumed development, releasing it for the PlayStation 2 and Xbox in May 2004.

In 2003, he left Flagship to form another video game company.

Game Republic
In 2005, Okamoto's new independent game company, Game Republic, released its first game Genji: Dawn of the Samurai. Genji is a game set in Feudal Japan with a similar playing style to the Onimusha series. A sequel, Genji: Days of the Blade, was released on the PlayStation 3 in late 2006. A new Game Republic game called Folklore (Folkssoul in Japan) was released in 2007.

Okamoto also developed a typical party game called Every Party, which was a launch title for the Xbox 360 in Japan.

In 2007, Game Republic signed with Brash Entertainment and started working on licensed games like Clash of the Titans. But then in November 2008, Brash Entertainment went out of business, and Game Republic had to turn to Namco Bandai for the release of Clash of the Titans.

In 2011, Game Republic also shut down due to debt, and a year later, Okamoto announced that he had retired from making console games and started working on mobile games.

Mixi
In recent years, he created the mobile games Dragon Hunter and Monster Strike (2013) for Mixi. Dragon Hunter was a moderate success, before Monster Strike became a major hit, competing with Puzzle & Dragons for the top spot on mobile charts. By 2018, Monster Strike had grossed over $7.2 billion, surpassing Puzzle & Dragons to become the highest-grossing mobile app of all time.

Influences and style
Okamoto has said that he gets ideas from scenery from movies, citing particularly the works of Akira Kurosawa and Chinese ghost stories. He commented that "We don't make games for ourselves - I don't actually play games very much."

References

External links
Yoshiki Okamoto personal website
Yoshiki Okamoto at MobyGames

Game Republic homepage (Japanese)
E3 2001: The Yoshiki Okamoto Interview, IGN
Yoshiki Okamoto: The Clown Prince of Gaming, Gamers Today
FAQ: Yoshiki Okamoto, EDGE

1961 births
Living people
Japanese chief executives
Japanese video game designers
Japanese video game producers
People from Ehime Prefecture
Capcom people
Red Dead
Street Fighter